Komlóstető is one of the suburban parts of the city of Miskolc. Komlóstető covers 8.59 km2.

According to the 2001 census, the population of Komlóstető-Vargahegy was 4,680, 2.5% of the population of the city of Miskolc.

Neighbourhoods of Miskolc